Rhene is a spider genus of the family Salticidae (jumping spiders).

Taxonomy
The genus was originally named Rhanis by C. L. Koch in 1846. However, this name had already been used for a beetle genus in 1834. Accordingly, Tamerlan Thorell provided the replacement name Rhene in 1869. The name Rhene is derived from the Greek woman's name Rhene.

Species

, the World Spider Catalog accepted the following extant species:

 Rhene albigera (C. L. Koch, 1846) – India to Korea, Sumatra
 Rhene amanzi Wesołowska & Haddad, 2013 – South Africa
 Rhene atellana (Thorell, 1895) – Myanmar
 Rhene atrata (Karsch, 1881) – Russia, China, Korea, Taiwan, Japan
 Rhene banksi Peckham & Peckham, 1902 – South Africa
 Rhene biguttata Peckham & Peckham, 1903 – South Africa
 Rhene brevipes (Thorell, 1891) – Sumatra
 Rhene bufo (Doleschall, 1859) – Myanmar to Sumatra
 Rhene callida Peckham & Peckham, 1895 – India
 Rhene callosa (Peckham & Peckham, 1895) – India
 Rhene cancer Wesołowska & Cumming, 2008 – Zimbabwe
 Rhene candida Fox, 1937 – China
 Rhene capensis Strand, 1909 – South Africa
 Rhene cooperi Lessert, 1925 – South Africa
 Rhene curta Wesołowska & Tomasiewicz, 2008 – Ethiopia
 Rhene daitarensis Prószyński, 1992 – India
 Rhene darjeelingiana Prószyński, 1992 – India
 Rhene deplanata (Karsch, 1880) – Philippines
 Rhene digitata Peng & Li, 2008 – China
 Rhene facilis Wesołowska & Russell-Smith, 2000 – Tanzania
 Rhene flavicomans Simon, 1902 – India, Bhutan, Sri Lanka
 Rhene flavigera (C. L. Koch, 1846) (type species) – China, Vietnam to Sumatra
 Rhene foai Simon, 1902 – South Africa
 Rhene formosa Rollard & Wesołowska, 2002 – Guinea
 Rhene habahumpa Barrion & Litsinger, 1995 – Philippines
 Rhene hinlalakea Barrion & Litsinger, 1995 – Philippines
 Rhene hirsuta (Thorell, 1877) – Sulawesi
 Rhene histrio (Thorell, 1891) – India
 Rhene ipis Fox, 1937 – China
 Rhene jelskii (Taczanowski, 1871) – Peru, French Guiana
 Rhene kenyaensis Wesołowska & Dawidowicz, 2014 – Kenya
 Rhene konradi Wesołowska, 2009 – South Africa
 Rhene legitima Wesołowska & Haddad, 2018 – South Africa
 Rhene lesserti Berland & Millot, 1941 – Senegal
 Rhene leucomelas (Thorell, 1891) – Philippines
 Rhene lingularis Haddad & Wesolowska, 2011 – South Africa
 Rhene machadoi Berland & Millot, 1941 – Guinea
 Rhene margarops (Thorell, 1877) – Sulawesi
 Rhene menglunensis Wang & Li, 2020 – China
 Rhene modesta Caporiacco, 1941 – Ethiopia
 Rhene mombasa Wesołowska & Dawidowicz, 2014 – Kenya
 Rhene mordax (Thorell, 1890) – Java
 Rhene mus (Simon, 1889) – India
 Rhene myunghwani Kim, 1996 – Korea
 Rhene nigrita (C. L. Koch, 1846) – Indonesia
 Rhene obscura Wesołowska & van Harten, 2007 – Yemen
 Rhene pallida (Thorell, 1895) – India, Bangladesh, Myanmar, China, Vietnam
 Rhene parvula Caporiacco, 1939 – Ethiopia
 Rhene phuntsholingensis Jastrzebski, 1997 – Bhutan, Nepal
 Rhene pinguis Wesołowska & Haddad, 2009 – South Africa
 Rhene plana (Schenkel, 1936) – China
 Rhene punctatus Wesołowska & Haddad, 2013 – South Africa
 Rhene rubrigera (Thorell, 1887) – India to China, Sumatra, Hawaii
 Rhene saeva (Giebel, 1863) – Java
 Rhene setipes Zabka, 1985 – China, Vietnam, Ryūkyū Islands
 Rhene sulfurea (Simon, 1885) – Senegal
 Rhene timidus Wesołowska & Haddad, 2013 – South Africa
 Rhene triapophyses Peng, 1995 – China
 Rhene yunnanensis (Peng & Xie, 1995) – China

References

External links
 

Salticidae
Taxa named by Tamerlan Thorell
Salticidae genera
Spiders of South America
Spiders of Asia
Spiders of Africa
Spiders of Hawaii